Ramon Tikaram is a British stage and screen actor of Indo-Fijian and Southeast Asian descent. He is known for playing such roles as Ferdy in the BBC television series This Life and Qadim Shah in the BBC One soap opera EastEnders.

Early life and education
Tikaram is the son of Pramod Tikaram, an Indo-Fijian officer of British Army, and Fatimah Rohani, a Sarawakian Malay mother. His younger sister is singer-songwriter Tanita Tikaram. The family moved frequently during Tikaram's youth, because of his father's military service with the British army. He attended military school in Dover before studying English at Kent University, where he discovered acting.

Career

Music and musical theatre

Tikaram starred as Judas in the West End production of Jesus Christ Superstar from 1997 to 1998.

Tikaram performed the role of the King of Siam in a UK tour of the musical The King and I, ending in May 2012.

Television and film
In 1996–97, he played the recurring character of Ferdy Garcia in the BBC TV series This Life. A 10th-anniversary return of the show in 2006 was based on Ferdy's funeral, and Tikaram therefore did not appear.

In 1997, Tikaram was offered a role in the Star Wars prequel trilogy, but refused because it required that he cut his hair.

In October 2009, it was announced that Tikaram would appear in the BBC One soap opera EastEnders. He played the part of Qadim Shah, father of the established character Amira Shah. He appeared on-screen in the role from 17 December 2009 to 29 April 2010 in two stints, then returned on 6 September 2011 and 6 January 2012 for short appearances.

He appeared as Prendahl in Game of Thrones in 2013.

Tikaram also appeared as Inspector Victor Aziz in Pennyworth since it premiered in 2019.

Voice acting and narration
Tikaram provided voice acting for the character of Gabe Weller in the 2009 video game Dead Space: Extraction.

In November 2012, he also provided the voice of World Eaters Captain Macer Varren for the Black Library audio drama Garro: Sword of Truth, part of the long-running Horus Heresy series.

He lent his voice for Dorian in Dragon Age: Inquisition, Gein in the cancelled Legacy of Kain: Dead Sun, and Ravindra 'Rav' Chaudhry in Need for Speed Payback.

He voiced the roles of Ozzy, Danby, and Second Officer Keen, characters in the 2018 video game Subnautica.

Tikaram also voiced the role of Godrick The Grafted in the 2022 video game Elden Ring.

Tikaram has also narrated a number of audiobooks.

Tikaram voices the character Ramattra from the 2022 video game Overwatch 2.

Discography

Singles
  (1992) German release DSB (Deutsche Schallplatten GmbH Berlin)
  (1992) German release DSB (Deutsche Schallplatten GmbH Berlin)

Album

Selected film credits
 Dean Spanley
 Kama Sutra: A Tale of Love
 Mischief Night
 5 Greedy Bankers
 Tad the Lost Explorer and the Secret of King Midas

Selected television credits
 Silent Witness episode "Nowhere Fast" (2004)
 Crossroads
 Dream Team
 EastEnders
 Feel Good
 Fortitude
 Game of Thrones
 Happy Valley
 Krakatoa: The Last Days
 Man Down
 The Mighty Boosh
 Mile High
 Moving On
 My Spy Family
 Primeval
 This Life
 Stella
 Thunderbirds Are Go
 Brassic
 Father Brown episode 1.3 "The Wrong Shape"
 Midsomer Murders episode 18.4 "A Dying Art"
 The Coroner episode 2.9 "Pieces of Eight"
 Death in Paradise series 6, episode 2
 Doctors series 19, episode 140 "Dreams are Made On"
 The Victim
 Pennyworth
 The Great

Selected video game credits
 Dead Space: Extraction
 Greedfall
 Fable III
 James Bond 007: Blood Stone
 Risen 2: Dark Waters
 Dragon Age: Inquisition
 Dragon Quest Heroes: The World Tree's Woe and the Blight Below
 Hitman
 Dark Souls III
 Need for Speed Payback
 Subnautica
 Total War: Warhammer II
Elden Ring
Xenoblade Chronicles 2: Torna – The Golden Country
Overwatch 2

References

External links
 
 BBC News Online: "This Life's Ferdy not coming back" from October 2006
 "Making Mischief" Future Movies from November 2011

Living people
English people of Indo-Fijian descent
Alumni of the University of London
Alumni of the University of Kent
People educated at the Duke of York's Royal Military School
English people of Malaysian descent
British male actors of Indian descent
21st-century English male actors
20th-century English male actors
English male film actors
English male television actors
English male voice actors
National Youth Theatre members
Singaporean emigrants to the United Kingdom
1967 births